TEV Miesbach is an ice hockey team in Miesbach, Germany. They play in the Oberliga, the third level of ice hockey in Germany. The club was founded in 1928.

External links
 Official site

Ice hockey teams in Germany
Ice hockey clubs established in 1928
Miesbach (district)
1928 establishments in Germany
Sport in Upper Bavaria